Gregory Ramon Anderson is a Tallahassee, Florida native who graduated from FAMU in 1994. He co-founded Rainforest Films, with fellow FAMU graduates Rob Hardy and Will Packer in 1994, working as a script writer, film producer, and fill-in actor. Rainforest Films has independently produced three feature films including Chocolate City, Trois, and Pandora's Box. Anderson wrote the screenplay for the film Stomp the Yard.

References

American male screenwriters
Writers from Tallahassee, Florida
Living people
Florida A&M University alumni
Screenwriters from Florida
Film producers from Florida
Year of birth missing (living people)